Pondok Bambu is a village (kelurahan) of Duren Sawit, East Jakarta, Indonesia. Before the establishment of the Subdistrict Duren Sawit, the village is under the administration of the Subdistrict Jatinegara.

References

Villages of Duren Sawit